The Obice da 210/22 modello 35 was an Italian heavy howitzer designed by the Italian Arms and Munitions Technical Service (STAM) and accepted into service by the Italian Army in 1938.  A total of 346 were ordered and the gun was produced by Ansaldo at their Pozzuoli factory.  However production was slow and approximately 20 were produced by 1942.  After Italy surrendered Germany seized as many as they could and a factory in Northern Italy continued to produce guns for the German Army until the end of the war.  The carriage was split trail with four wheels which raised from the ground for firing and the gun was trunnioned under the breech to allow for maximum recoil and elevation.

Derivatives and designations
 21 cm 39.M:  Hungarian designation for guns purchased from Italy.
 21 cm 40.M:  Hungarian-produced version featuring carriage modifications.
 21 cm 41.M:  Final Hungarian-produced version which entered production in 1943.
 21 cm Haubitze 520(i):  German designation for guns captured after the Italian surrender in 1943 and kept in production until the end of the war.

References
 Hogg, Ian Twentieth-Century Artillery. New York: Barnes & Nobles, 2000 
 https://web.archive.org/web/20170401233549/http://ww2photo.se/gun/ita/ha/210-22.htm

See also
 List of artillery

World War II artillery of Italy
Field artillery
210 mm artillery
Gio. Ansaldo & C. artillery
Military equipment introduced in the 1930s